Stephan Dupuis is a Canadian make-up artist who won at the 59th Academy Awards for Best Makeup for the film The Fly. The win was shared with Chris Walas.

Selected filmography

A Dangerous Method (2011)
300 (2007)
I Am Legend (2007)
A History of Violence (2005)
Jason X (2002)
The Man Without a Face (1993)
Stalin (1992)
Indiana Jones and the Last Crusade (1989)
The Fly II (1989)
Poltergeist III (1988)
RoboCop (1987)
The Fly (1986)
Amityville II: The Possession (1982)
Quest for Fire (1982)
Scanners (1981)
City on Fire (1979)

References

External links

Best Makeup Academy Award winners
Living people
Year of birth missing (living people)
Canadian make-up artists